Pârvu Mutu (Pârvu the Mute, nickname of Pârvu Pârvescu; 1657–1735) was a Wallachian Romanian muralist and church painter.

He was born in the town of Câmpulung as the sixth son of the Orthodox priest Ioan Pârvescu, and began his career as a church painter at the age of 12. He lived some 40 years in Moldavia, returning to Wallachia in 1702. In 1718 he retired to the Mărgineni Monastery, the place where he died.

Pârvu Mutu painted in fresco style the interiors of churches in Mărgineni, Măgureni, Cotroceni, Călineşti, Aninoasa, Fiindenii Doamnei, Colţea, Bordeşti, Filipeştii de Pădure and the Sfântul Gheorghe Nou church in Bucharest. Many of his works were commissioned by the Cantacuzino family.

He is mostly remembered for his portraits and his frescoes of church founders.

References 
 

1657 births
1735 deaths
Fresco painters
Members of the Romanian Orthodox Church
People from Câmpulung
Romanian muralists